Ulrike Baumgartner (born 12 May 1974) is an Austrian former cyclist. She won the Austrian National Road Race Championships in 1999.

References

External links
 

1974 births
Living people
Austrian female cyclists
Place of birth missing (living people)
20th-century Austrian women